Animal Cops is an American reality television franchise that are originally produced in the United States for Animal Planet. Animal Planet has also presented a special edition of Animal Cops with 2009 episodes such as "Back from the Brink" and "Extreme Danger". Also scenes from Animal Planet's other show "Animal Precinct" have been featured in "Animal Cops" special, "Cats: Born to Survive" (about various cases involving cats and featured experts talking about the natural traits that help cats to survive). This is due to "Animal Cops"  being based on the "Animal Precinct" concept.

Series
The series included the following:
Animal Cops: Detroit (2002–2008)
Animal Cops: Houston (2003–2012, 2014–2015)
Animal Cops: Philadelphia (2009–2010)
Animal Cops: San Francisco (2005)
Animal Cops: South Africa (2008)
Animal Cops: Phoenix (2006–2009), (2016-2018); formerly titled as Animal Planet Heroes: Phoenix
Animal Cops: Miami (2010–2011)

See also
List of programs broadcast by Animal Planet
Animal Precinct (2001–2008)
Miami Animal Police (2004–2006)

References

https://www.azcentral.com/story/entertainment/television/2017/02/14/animal-cops-phoenix-tv-show-arizona-humane-society-animal-planet/97859874/
https://www.sfgate.com/entertainment/article/Animal-Planet-s-Cops-tames-San-Francisco-2702358.php
https://www.tvwise.co.uk/2014/10/discovery-renews-animal-cops-houston-19th-season/

External links

Animal Planet original programming
2000s American reality television series
2010s American reality television series
2000s American documentary television series
2010s American documentary television series
2000s American crime television series
2010s American crime television series